Lucia may refer to:

Arts and culture 
 Lucía, a 1968 Cuban film by Humberto Solás
 Lucia (film), a 2013 Kannada-language film
 Lucia & The Best Boys, a Scottish indie rock band formerly known as LUCIA
 "Lucia", a Swedish children's song published in Barnens svenska sångbok
 Lucia Ashton, the title character of Lucia di Lammermoor, a 1836 opera by Gaetano Donizetti
 one of the title characters of Mapp and Lucia, a series of novels by E. F. Benson
 Saint Lucy's Day, a Christian feast day observed on 13 December

Places
 Lucia, California, a hamlet in Big Sur, California
 La Lucia, a suburb in Umhlanga, KwaZulu-Natal, South Africa

Other uses
 Lucia (butterfly), a butterfly genus from the tribe Luciini
 Lucia (moth), a synonym of the moth genus Adrapsa
 Lucia (name), a feminine given name and a surname, including a list of people and fictional characters with the name Lucia or Lucía
 222 Lucia, an asteroid

See also
 Saint Lucia (disambiguation)
 Santa Lucia (disambiguation)
 Lucian (disambiguation)
 Lusia (disambiguation)
 Lutzia
 Lucilia (disambiguation)